D'Alessandro, Dalessandro, or Dallesandro is a surname. Notable people with the surname include:

D'Alessandro
 Andrés D'Alessandro (born 1981), Argentine footballer
 Deanna D'Alessandro, Australian chemist
 Dominic D'Alessandro (born 1947), Italian former CEO of Manulife Financial
 Franco D'Alessandro (born 1967/1969), American playwright
 Jorge D'Alessandro (born 1949), Argentine former footballer
 Lorenzo d'Alessandro (died 1503), Italian painter and interpreter
 Luciano D'Alessandro (born 1977), Venezuelan actor
 Marco D'Alessandro (born 1991), Italian footballer
 Matteo D'Alessandro (born 1989), Italian footballer
 Pete D'Alessandro, General Manager of the Sacramento Kings of the NBA
 Toni Dalli (born name Antonio D'Alessandro, born 1933), Italian musician and restaurant owner

D'Alesandro
 Thomas D'Alesandro Jr. (1903-1987), American politician
 Thomas D'Alesandro III (1929-2019), American politician
 Nancy D'Alesandro Pelosi (born 1940), American politician and former Speaker of the House of Representatives

Dalessandro
 Andrea Dalessandro, American politician
 David Dalessandro, University of Pittsburgh administrator
 James Dalessandro (born 1948), American writer and filmmaker
 Peter J. Dalessandro (1918–1997), United States Army Medal of Honor awardee
 Robert J. Dalessandro (born 1958), American historian and author

Dallesandro
 Joe Dallesandro (born 1948), American actor

Italian-language surnames
Patronymic surnames
Surnames from given names